Santa Fe is an unincorporated community in Clay Township, Spencer County, in the U.S. state of Indiana.

History
Santa Fe was laid out in 1846.

Geography

References

Unincorporated communities in Spencer County, Indiana
Unincorporated communities in Indiana